Triopha maculata, common name spotted triopha or speckled triopha, is a species of colorful sea slug, a nudibranch, a shell-less marine gastropod mollusk in the family Polyceridae. This species is very variable in color.

Distribution
This nudibranch lives in the eastern Pacific Ocean, from Vancouver, British Columbia, Canada, to Baja California, Mexico. It also lives in Japan.

Description
Triopha maculata can, on rare occasions, grow as large as 180 mm (a little more than 7 inches) but usually the maximum length is 50 mm (about 2 inches.)

The color can be a very pale and translucent yellow, or it can be a darker yellow, orange, red, and even dark brown. There are always raised whitish spots, hence the name maculata, meaning spotted.

Life habits
This species feeds on bryozoans.

References

Behrens, D.W., 1980, Pacific Coast Nudibranchs: a guide to the opisthobranchs of the northeastern Pacific, Sea Challenger Books, Washington.

External links

 Sea Slug Forum: 

Polyceridae
Gastropods described in 1905